Haverthwaite railway station is a railway station on the preserved Lakeside and Haverthwaite Railway in Cumbria, England.

History

The station opened on 1 June 1869, with sidings and a goods shed.
The station originally served the nearby village of Haverthwaite, Cumbria. A long siding once served the iron works blast furnace of Backbarrow. Until 1935, gunpowder from Low Wood was brought to the main line by a horse-worked narrow gauge tramway. Passenger services were withdrawn from the station from 30 September 1946 but the station was not officially closed until 13 June 1955. Summer only passenger trains continued to pass through the station until 1965.

The station today
The station has a main building which houses a booking hall and waiting room. There is also a toilet block and plenty of outside seating. The station has a footbridge and a second platform, however these are currently not in use. Haverthwaite also is the location of the engine sheds and workshops.

References

External links

Official Site
Furness Railway Trust

Former Furness Railway stations
Furness
Tourist attractions in Cumbria
Lakeside and Haverthwaite Railway
Railway stations in Great Britain opened in 1869
Railway stations in Great Britain closed in 1955
Heritage railway stations in Cumbria
1869 establishments in England